Fat Music is a series of eight compilation albums published by Fat Wreck Chords since 1994. The albums include artists from the label's roster, focusing on then-current and upcoming releases and often including previously unreleased material. In total the series includes 127 songs contributed by 49 different artists, focusing stylistically on punk rock and various subgenres such as hardcore punk, pop punk, ska punk, skate punk, and street punk. The Fat Music series tapered off after its sixth installment as the label moved from compact discs toward digital downloads for its samplers instead. Subsequent physical compilation albums released by Fat Wreck Chords were themed around social and political causes, including the benefit albums Liberation (2003) and Protect (2005), and the two volumes of Rock Against Bush released preceding the 2004 United States presidential election. In 2010 the Fat Music series was revived with the release of a seventh volume, Harder, Fatter + Louder!

Discography 
 Fat Music for Fat People (1994)
 Survival of the Fattest (1996)
 Physical Fatness (1997)
 Life in the Fat Lane (1999)
 Live Fat, Die Young (2001)
 Uncontrollable Fatulence (2002)
 Harder, Fatter + Louder! (2010)
 Going Nowhere Fat (2015)
 Mild in the Streets: Fat Music Unplugged (2016)

Artists 
A total of 49 artists have contributed songs to the Fat Music compilation series. Good Riddance, No Use for a Name, NOFX, and Strung Out are the only acts to have appeared on all seven volumes. Lagwagon have appeared on six installments and have contributed the most tracks to the series, with a total of eight songs.

Contributing artists included:

88 Fingers Louie
Against Me!
American Steel
Anti-Flag
The Ataris
Avail
Banner Pilot
Bracket
Chixdiggit!
Cobra Skulls
Consumed
Dead to Me
The Dickies
Diesel Boy
Dillinger Four
Fabulous Disaster
Face to Face

The Flatliners
Frenzal Rhomb
Goober Patrol
Good Riddance
Guns 'N' Wankers
Hi-Standard
Lagwagon
The Lawrence Arms
Less Than Jake
Mad Caddies
Me First and the Gimme Gimmes
NOFX
None More Black
No Use for a Name
Old Man Markley
Pour Habit

Propagandhi
Rancid
The Real McKenzies
Rise Against
Screeching Weasel
Screw 32
Sick of It All
Tony Sly
Smoke or Fire
Snuff
Strung Out
Swingin' Utters
Teenage Bottlerocket
Tilt
Wizo
Zero Down

See also 
List of punk compilation albums